Deer Ridge is an unincorporated community in Lewis County, in the U.S. state of Missouri.

History
A post office called Deer Ridge was established in 1854, and remained in operation until 1906. The community took its name from nearby ridge where deer were abundant.

References

Unincorporated communities in Lewis County, Missouri
Unincorporated communities in Missouri